Grimmen station is a railway station in the municipality of Grimmen, located in the Vorpommern-Rügen district in Mecklenburg-Vorpommern, Germany.

References

Railway stations in Mecklenburg-Western Pomerania
Buildings and structures in Vorpommern-Rügen
Railway stations in Germany opened in 1878